In mathematics, an affine braid group is a braid group associated to an  affine Coxeter system.  Their group rings have quotients called affine Hecke algebras. They are subgroups of double affine braid groups.

Definition

References

 
Macdonald, I. G. Affine Hecke Algebras and Orthogonal Polynomials. Cambridge Tracts in Mathematics, 157. Cambridge University Press, Cambridge, Eng., 2003. x+175 pp.  

Braid groups
Representation theory